Dicranochaete is a genus of green algae in the order Chaetopeltidales. It is the only genus in the family Dicranochaetaceae.

References

External links

Chlorophyceae genera
Chaetopeltidales